John Robert Murdock (April 20, 1885 –
February 14, 1972) was a U.S. Representative from Arizona.

Born in homestead near Lewistown, Missouri, Murdock attended the public schools.
He graduated from  State Teachers' College , Kirksville, Missouri, in 1912 and received a bachelors degree at the University of Iowa in 1925.  He attended graduate school at the University of Arizona and at the University of California at Berkeley.

He was an elementary school teacher and principal in Missouri before he went to the University of Iowa.  He was an instructor in the Normal School at Tempe, Arizona, predecessor of Arizona State University.  He was then Dean of this institution from 1933 to 1937.  He wrote several textbooks on history and government.

Murdock was elected as a Democrat to the 75th Congress and to the seven succeeding Congresses, serving from January 3, 1937 to January 3, 1953.  For his first six terms, he was one of two at-large congressmen from Arizona.  When the state was split into two districts in 1948, Murdock was elected from the 1st District, comprising Phoenix and Maricopa County.  He served as chairman of the Committee on Memorials (Seventy-eighth Congress), Committee on Irrigation and Reclamation (Seventy-ninth Congress), and Committee on Interior and Insular Affairs (Eighty-second Congress).  He was an unsuccessful candidate for reelection in 1952 to the Eighty-third Congress, losing to Republican challenger John Jacob Rhodes.  He was the first Democratic incumbent to lose a House election in the state.

He was married to Myrtle Cheney Murdock,  who popularized the accomplishments of Constantino Brumidi.

He retired and resided in Scottsdale, Arizona and died in Phoenix, Arizona on February 14, 1972.  He was interred in Double Butte Cemetery, Tempe, Arizona.

See also
 List of members of the House Un-American Activities Committee

References

External links
 

1885 births
1972 deaths
University of Iowa alumni
University of Arizona alumni
University of California, Berkeley alumni
Democratic Party members of the United States House of Representatives from Arizona
20th-century American politicians